NA-45 (Dera Ismail Khan-II) is a constituency for the National Assembly of Pakistan. The constituency was created in 2018 by bifurcating NA-25 (Dera Ismail Khan-cum-Tank) where Tank district shared its representation with a portion of Dera Ismail Khan District. In 2018, Tank District got its own constituency while the Dera Ismail Khan areas of the old constituency are now included in NA-39 (Dera Ismail Khan-II). In 2022 Constituency no is changed into NA-45 (Dera Ismail Khan-II)

Members of Parliament

2018-2022: NA-39 (Dera Ismail Khan-II)

2018 general election 

General elections were held on 25 July 2018.

See also
NA-44 Dera Ismail Khan-I
NA-46 Islamabad-I

References

External links 
 Election result's official website

39
39